Bear's Den Rural Historic District is a national historic district located at Bluemont, Clarke County and Loudoun County, Virginia. It encompasses 152 contributing buildings, 12 contributing sites, 8 contributing structures, and 1 contributing object. The district includes a collection of late-19th- and early-20th-century dwellings that were constructed primarily as summer homes by wealthy Washingtonians who were attracted by the mountain's cooler summer climate.  Their architecture reflects a number of popular styles, primarily American Craftsman / Bungalow, Colonial Revival, and Queen Anne styles.  Other contributing buildings include: farm outbuildings such as barns and stables; domestic outbuildings such as spring houses, meat houses, guest cottages, root cellars, and garages; a former school; and a former church.  The contributing sites include the ruins of buildings; including picnic shelters, above-ground cisterns, an old road bed; and the contributing object is a county boundary marker.

It was listed on the National Register of Historic Places in 1996.

References

Historic districts in Loudoun County, Virginia
Colonial Revival architecture in Virginia
Queen Anne architecture in Virginia
Historic districts in Clarke County, Virginia
National Register of Historic Places in Clarke County, Virginia
National Register of Historic Places in Loudoun County, Virginia
Historic districts on the National Register of Historic Places in Virginia